Union Hall is a historic Grange meeting hall located in the hamlet of Point Peninsula, Lyme, Jefferson County, New York.  It was built in 1908, and is a two-story, wood-frame building. It has a front gable roof and sits on a limestone foundation.  At the ground floor is a commercial storefront.

It was added to the National Register of Historic Places in 1990 as one result of a study of historic resources of Lyme.

References

Grange buildings on the National Register of Historic Places in New York (state)
Buildings and structures completed in 1908
Buildings and structures in Jefferson County, New York
National Register of Historic Places in Jefferson County, New York
1908 establishments in New York (state)